Marília is a Brazilian municipality in the midwestern region of the state of São Paulo. It is located at an altitude of 675 meters. The population is 240,590 (2020 est.) in an area of 1170 km2.

History

In 1923, Antônio Pereira da Silva and his son José Pereira da Silva were the pioneers of the region, cleared land next to Feio and Peixe rivers. This land was named Alto Cafezal, or "High Coffee Plantation".

A city of Araraquara region deputy at the time, Bento de Abreu Sampaio Vidal held in 1926 a parcel of their assets.

In 1927, Colonel José Brás or Jose' da Silva Nogueira whose family origin in Itapetininga, arrived in Marilia. His family held 40% of the farm land named Bonfim, and the process of urbanization began with the allotment of this farm.

Companhia Paulista Railway had been advancing its tracks from São Paulo to get to the town of Lácio, and in accordance with its plan, the roads that were being opened at the branch were named in alphabetical order. The next branch should have its name beginning with the letter "M." "Maratona", "Mogúncio" and "Macau" were suggested, but Vidal was not satisfied with them. So, in one of his trips to Europe by ship, as he read Tomás Antônio Gonzaga's Marília de Dirceu, he chose the name Marília from the poetry book.

The city of Marília was created with this name by State Law No. 2161 on December 22, 1926, but remained as a borough of Cafelândia. In 1928, Marília was raised to the status of municipality by State Law No. 2320 of December 24. Its anniversary is celebrated on April 4, 1929.

At first, the economy of Marília was based on the cultivation of coffee, being replaced by cotton. The financial success originated from this latter crop led to the installation of the first two industries in the city (two cottonseed oil) in the mid-1930s. With the expansion of the industrialization in São Paulo state, rail and highways were also built, thereby linking Marilia to various regions of the state of São Paulo and northern Paraná.

In the 1940s the city established itself as a development of the West Paulista, when there was a large and growing urban population.

In the 1970s, there was a new industrial cycle in the city with the installation of new industries, specially food processing and welding. With the subsequent installation of several university courses, Marília attracted more people to the region, which accelerated the development of the city as a commercial & industrial hub.

Marília today has approximately 50 food industries in the area and it is known as the "National Capital of Food Processing."

Geography

Climate
The city's climate is subtropical with the following characteristics:
Average annual temperature: 18,5 °C
Hottest month in January: 23.0 °C
Coldest month in June: 13.2 °C
Absolute Maximum: 39.4 °C
Absolute minimum: -4.6 °C

Demography

Data of Census of 2000:
Total population:
Metro: 189,719
Rural: 7623
Men: 96,502
Women: 100,840
Population density (inhabitants / km ²): 186.42 (2007)
Infant mortality up to 1 year (per thousand): 15.57
Life expectancy (years): 74.37
Total Fertility rate: 2.21
Literacy rate: 95.35%
Human Development Index (HDI): 0.821
HDI-R Income: 0.885
HDI-L Longevity: 0.822
HDI-E Education: 0.962

Government

The current mayor is Daniel Alonso (PSDB) elected on 2016, whose mandate is valid until 2020. The government receives little state funding due to high tax returns from the local tax income.

Education
The city has several courses distributed in their colleges and universities. There are three universities: two private (Unimar and UNIVEM) and one public (UNESP)) and three colleges, among them the school of medicine (Faculdade de Medicina de Marília).

Transport

Marilia has one airport for regional and domestic flights named Frank Miloye Milenkowichi Airport. The city is crossed by 3 highways: the SP-294, the SP-333 and Rodovia Transbrasiliana (Transbrazilian Highway). As most cities in the region, Marilia no longer has passenger railway service.
One of Brazil's largest airlines, TAM, got its start as Táxi Aéreo Marília here in 1961.

Interesting facts

Ethnic Background: Marilia's population is mainly formed by descendants of Luso-African Brazilians, Portuguese, Japanese, Italians, Germans and Spaniards.
The first Brazilian olympic medalist was from Marilia. Tetsuo Okamoto won a bronze medal in Helsinki in 1952, swimming 1500 m freestyle.
The Southern Hemisphere's largest airline, TAM Brazilian Airlines, was founded in Marilia.
Banco Bradesco was founded by Amador Aguiar on March 10, 1943, in Marilia, and it is the second largest private bank in Brazil today.
A pre-historic crocodile, Mariliasuchus amarali, was found in Marilia and its name was a tribute to the city.
 On 5 October 1971, approximately at 5:00 pm, fell onto the city of Marília the last meteorite registered in the state of São Paulo: the Marília Meteorite. Seven fragments totaling about 2.5 kg were found, and the Marília Meteorite was subsequently classified as a chondrite H4.

Twin towns and sister cities
Marília currently has three sister cities:
  Buffalo, New York, United States of America
   Higashihiroshima, Hiroshima, Japan
  Izumisano, Osaka, Japan

Notable people
Glamour Garcia - actress
Guilherme de Cássio Alves - football player
Isabella Menin - model and Miss Grand International 2022
Jorge Antonio Putinatti - football player
José Antônio Toffoli - lawyer and member of Supreme Federal Court (Brazil)
Jurandir de Freitas- football player
Tetsuo Okamoto- swimmer
Yoshiharu Kohayakawa- mathematician

References

 Marília's City Hall webpage
 Marília's Municipality's Chamber

 
1928 establishments in Brazil
Populated places established in 1928